Rémi Feuillet (born 22 December 1992) is a Mauritian judoka.

He was introduced to Judo by his father Frédéric who is a former national technical director of the Mauritian judo team. He is based in France and lives in Val-d'Oise and trains in Villiers-le-Bel.

He won two consecutive bronze medals at the African Judo Championships and finished seventh at the World Judo Championships. He was selected to compete at the 2020 Summer Games and drawn against Shoichiro Mukai in the first round.

References

External links
 

1992 births
Living people
Mauritian male judoka
French male judoka
Olympic judoka of Mauritius
Judoka at the 2020 Summer Olympics
Mauritian people of French descent
Mauritian expatriate sportspeople in France
African Games medalists in judo
African Games bronze medalists for Mauritius
Competitors at the 2019 African Games